Tropical Cyclone Cempaka was a tropical cyclone that impacted the island of Java and Bali, Indonesia in November 2017. Although it did not make landfall and only developed to a Category 1 tropical cyclone, Cempaka managed to cause 41 deaths, with more than 20,000 people evacuated and causing around US$83.6 million in damages. Cempaka was the fourth cyclone to be registered in Indonesia by the Tropical Cyclone Warning Center of the Indonesian Meteorology, Climatology, and Geophysical Agency (BMKG) since 2008 and the first since Cyclone Bakung in 2014. It also came closer to making landfall in that country than any other cyclone on record.

Meteorological history 

A Tropical Cyclone Formation Alert was issued by the Joint Typhoon Warning Center the next morning on 27 November, stating that satellite imagery depicted flaring convection near the center of the system. BMKG warned of heavy rainfall across the island of Java with possible flooding and landslides. On 29 November, Cempaka weakened into a tropical low and turned to the southwest away from Java. It continued moving to the southwest on the following day. TCWC Perth and Jakarta last mentioned Cempaka on 1 December.

Impact

Cyclone Cempaka never made landfall, but the rainfall it brought caused severe flooding and landslides across 28 regencies and cities in Java, mainly along the southern part of the island. Tornadoes were also reported in the area. Pacitan received  of rain on 27 November while Yogyakarta received  on 28 November, both considered to be "extreme" amounts of daily rainfall by BMKG. On 29 November, the government of Yogyakarta declared an emergency. By 30 November, 26 deaths were reported and more than 14,000 people were evacuated in Central Java, East Java, and Yogyakarta according to the Indonesian National Board for Disaster Management (BNPB). Tens of thousands of houses and agricultural lands were flooded. Roads were covered by landslides and bridges were destroyed in border regencies of Central Java and East Java, isolating some remote villages. Indonesians and several politicians took into social media to express their condolences using the hashtag #PrayForPacitan. President Joko Widodo called the people to "remain vigilant" while relief efforts were being undertaken by the national and local government agencies. The cyclone also changed the direction of ash from Agung Volcano in Bali from eastward toward Lombok to westward across Banyuwangi and Jember. By early December, BNPB counted that at least 41 people reportedly had died in regards to the cyclone. Victims were spread in Pacitan, Yogyakarta region, Wonogiri, Purworejo, and Wonosobo. More than 28,000 were staying in shelters while the cost of the damages was estimated at Rp1.13 trillion (US$83.6 million).

Rarity
The region of Indonesia is not generally traversed by tropical cyclones, although a lot of systems have historically formed there. Cyclone Cempaka was among the few tropical cyclones in the southern hemisphere which ever struck the region. An analysis of tropical cyclone data from the Bureau of Meteorology since 1907 to 2017 found that only around 0.62% of all cyclones in the Australian region during those years occurred north of the 10th parallel south.

See also

Weather of 2017 and 2018
Tropical cyclones in 2017 and 2018
Tropical Storm Vamei
Cyclone Durga
Cyclone Anggrek
Cyclone Bakung
Cyclone Savannah
Cyclone Seroja

References

External links

 TCWC Jakarta - BMKG 

Cempaka
Cyclone Cempaka
Cempaka 2017
Cempaka 2017
Cempaka
Floods in Indonesia